The FMRAAM (Future Medium Range Air to Air Missile) was a modified ramjet powered version of the Hughes (now Raytheon) AIM-120 AMRAAM Beyond Visual Range (BVR) air-to-air missile that was conceived during the mid-1990s to fulfill British requirements for a new longer range missile to use in place of the AMRAAM on their new Eurofighter Typhoon fighter. It competed with and lost to the Meteor (missile), thus never reaching production.

See also 
 AIM-152 AAAM
KS-172

References 

International air-to-air missiles
Raytheon Company products